Ihor Huk (born 11 June 2002) is a Ukrainian professional footballer who plays as a defender for Veres Rivne.

Career
Huk is a product of the Hirnyk Sosnivka, BRW-VIK Volodymyr-Volynskyi and Dynamo Kyiv youth academy systems.

In September 2020, he signed a three-year contract with Veres Rivne in the Ukrainian First League, where he made his debut against FC Hirnyk-Sport Horishni Plavni on 12 June 2021.

References

External links
 
 

2002 births
Living people
Ukrainian footballers
FC Dynamo Kyiv players
NK Veres Rivne players
FC Zvyahel Novohrad-Volynskyi players
Ukrainian First League players
Ukrainian Second League players
Association football defenders